Jie Zhou may refer to:
Jiezhou, a prefecture between the 9th and 20th centuries in modern Gansu, China
Zhou Jie (born 1970), Chinese actor surnamed Zhou